Strășeni is an administrative district in the central part of Moldova.  Its administrative center and leading city is Strășeni.    As of 1 January 2011, its population was 91,100.
The other principal town is Bucovăț,  to the north of the Moldovan capital.   Otherwise the district is divided between rural communities.

History

The present territory of the district is inhabited since the Stone Age, 30–20.000 BC. Localities with the oldest historical attestation are Căpriana, Dolna, Lozova and Vorniceni, they are first attested in 1420. Căpriana monastery in 1429 received the status of the monastery. The present territory of the district Strășeni, was part of the medieval lands Lăpușna and Orhei boundary of which is on the Bîc River. In 1545 is remembered by scribes, Strășeni district center. In the 16th-18th centuries, the district develop both economic (trade, agriculture, forestry) and cultural (built monasteries and churches), as there has been a major increase of population. In 1812, after the Russo-Turkish War (1806-1812), is the occupation of Basarabia, Russian Empire during this period (1812-1917), there is an intense russification of the native population. In 1918 after the collapse of the Russian Empire, Bessarabia united with Romania in this period (1918-1940, 1941-1944), the district is part of the Chișinău County. In 1940 after Molotov-Ribbentrop Treaty, Basarabia is occupied by the USSR. In 1991 as a result of the proclamation of Independence of Moldova, part and residence of the Chișinău County (1991-2003), and in 2003 became administrative unit of Moldova.

Geography

Strășeni district is located in the central part of Republic of Moldova. The neighboring district's are Călărași District in north-west, Orhei District in north-east, Criuleni District in east, municipality of Chișinău, Ialoveni District and Hîncești District in south and Nisporeni in west. District is located on the Central Moldavian Plateau, and Codri forest region. Relief hilly terrain sloping from northwest to southeast, cut by valleys and rivers. Erosion processes with a high intensity. The soil is mainly brown soil forest and gray soil.

Fauna
Fauna typical central Europe, with the presence of such mammals such as fox, wild boar, deer, hedgehogs, wild cat, red deer, wolf, raccoon dog, wild cat, ferret and others. Of birds: hawk, crow, stork, eagles, egrets and more. In the past forests were populated district of: brown bear, elk, bull, wisent, disappeared due to excessive hunting, but the deforestation.

Flora

Forests occupy 36.6% of the district are characterized by the presence of oak, english oak, beech, hornbeam, maple, ash, lime and other trees. From plants: clover, bell, nettle and others.

Rivers
District is located in the Nistru river basin. The main tributaries that cross the district are: Ichel (102 km, 63 miles) and Bic (152 km, 94 miles). Most lakes have a natural origin. The largest is Ghidighici Reservoir.

Administrative subdivisions
Localities: 39
Administrative center: Strășeni
Cities: Bucovăț, Strășeni
Villages: 12
Communes: 25

Demographics
1 January 2012 the district population was 91,500 of which 23.7% urban and 76.3% rural population

Births (2010): 1163 (12.7 per 1000)
Deaths (2010): 1251 (13.7 per 1000)
Growth Rate (2010): -88 (-1.0 per 1000)

Ethnic groups 
 

Footnote: * There is an ongoing controversy regarding the ethnic identification of Moldovans and Romanians.

Religion 
Christians - 98.5%
Orthodox Christians - 97.1%
Protestant - 1.4%
Baptists - 0.7%
Seventh-day Adventists - 0.3%
Pentecostals - 0.2%
Evangelicals - 0.2%
Other - 1.0%
No Religion - 0.4%
Atheists - 0.1%

Economy

Main branches of the economy are agriculture and manufacturing in district. Soil and climatic conditions favor the growth of cereals, sunflower, grapes, vegetables, fruit and other crops. Of mineral resources in the district is stone, gravel, pebbles and sand of building in Micauti career. Communication services are provided in Strășeni two companies "Moldtelecom" and "Post of Moldova".
The territory they are operating 15 factories processing of grapes, a poultry factory in Bucovăţ. Industry district is represented by 17 companies. The largest factory: SA "Marsrut", JSC "Caan" experimental-mechanical plant (included in the national privatization program.

Arable land occupies 18 903 ha (25.9%) of the total agricultural land, vineyards occupy 8292 ha (11.3%), plantations of orchards 3.386 ha (4.6%), 3244 ha grassland (4.4%), 242 ha plantation of fruit trees (0.3%), some 451 ha (0.6%).

Education
In district active: 42 educational institutions, including: Total number of students: 10,721. Currently the educational institutions of district teacher's operate in 1040.

Politics
Strășeni district, both political and electoral support of right-wing parties in Moldova represented by the AEI. PCRM is in a continuous fall in the last three elections.

During the last three elections AEI had an increase of 73.0%

Elections

|-
!style="background-color:#E9E9E9" align=center colspan="2" valign=center|Parties and coalitions
!style="background-color:#E9E9E9" align=right|Votes
!style="background-color:#E9E9E9" align=right|%
!style="background-color:#E9E9E9" align=right|+/−
|-
| 
|align=left|Liberal Democratic Party of Moldova
|align="right"|17,719
|align="right"|41.13
|align="right"|+23.06
|-
| 
|align=left|Party of Communists of the Republic of Moldova
|align="right"|11,389
|align="right"|26.44
|align="right"|−6.42
|-
| 
|align=left|Liberal Party
|align="right"|5,403
|align="right"|12.54
|align="right"|−8.63
|-
| 
|align=left|Democratic Party of Moldova
|align="right"|4,862
|align="right"|11,29
|align="right"|-0.73
|-
| 
|align=left|Party Alliance Our Moldova
|align="right"|874
|align="right"|2.03
|align="right"|−8.93
|-
|bgcolor=#0033cc|
|align=left|European Action Movement
|align="right"|865
|align="right"|2.01
|align="right"|+2.01
|-
|bgcolor="grey"|
|align=left|Other Party
|align="right"|2,412
|align="right"|5.56
|align="right"|+0.64
|-
|align=left style="background-color:#E9E9E9" colspan="2"|Total (turnout 58.17%)
|width="30" align="right" style="background-color:#E9E9E9"|43,396
|width="30" align="right" style="background-color:#E9E9E9"|100.00
|width="30" align="right" style="background-color:#E9E9E9"|

Culture
In Strășeni: 72 cultural institutions, a culture house, 32 community centers, clubs, 35 libraries, two art schools, three museums and a famous monastic complex.

Health
In Strășeni district: a hospital with general fund of 192 beds, a center of family physicians in the composition of which are 15 offices of family doctors, 13 health centers, 9 offices of health, the health district population. District operates: 134 doctors, 297 personal care environment, medical and auxiliary personnel 306.

Transportation
All localities have regular routes to regional centers and capital. The district is crossed by railways, means of communication used extensively to transport goods by business district, and especially the town Strășeni. District is crossed by the M1 road highway (Chisinau-Ungheni).

References
 District population per year
 District site
 Strășeni district council
 Results of 2010 Parliamentary election

 
Districts of Moldova